Confessions is a popular feature which first appeared on the BBC Radio 1 weekday breakfast show in the early 1990s, devised by its host, Simon Mayo.

Mayo, who had hosted the show since 1988, started the feature in August 1990, partly due to the rising interest in his own Christian faith, and it caught on very quickly. Listeners would write in to "Father Mayo" and "confess" to their "sins", and each morning at 8:35am Mayo would broadcast one to the nation over Tomaso Giovanni Albinoni's Adagio for Organ and Strings in G minor.

The "confessions" were often humorous and sometimes lacking in taste or scruples. At the peak of the feature, Mayo received more than one hundred confessions a week. Some were sincere confessions and Mayo discounted any which admitted to crime, adultery, overt cruelty or other more serious activities.

Infamous confessions included:

 A family who put some herbs into a Christmas pudding which had been sent to them by relatives in Australia, only to discover later they were a late uncle's ashes (based on an urban myth)
 A man who, desperate to urinate on a train with no toilet, decided to do so out of a window, only to inadvertently spray numerous people waiting on a platform which suddenly appeared
 A man who, tired of his flatmate's complaining about food wastage, cooked a pie for him before replacing the meat with raw cat food
 A woman who, annoyed with her boyfriend's lateness in coming home for his evening meal, spread chili con carne all over his sports car
 A man who found some negatives of his brother's wife in the nude and had them developed before sending them to an adult magazine's Readers' Wives section
 A Gulf War logistics corporal put some "fallen off the back of a lorry glasses under his truck. New owner got bomb disposal out thinking it was an IED."

After completing each confession, Mayo would ask his crew - consisting of weather and travel presenter Dianne Oxberry, newsreader Rod McKenzie, or their respective stand-ins if they were away, and the day's "special guest producer" played by the show's own producer Ric Blaxill - whether they would "forgive" the confessor or not.

Some confessions prompted complaints from listeners, especially if they involved particularly cruel behaviour towards others or any that involved living creatures, even if there was no hint of animal cruelty in the confession.

The feature was a huge success. Word spread internationally and a story made the front page of The Wall Street Journal, with Mayo often being asked if he was "trying to challenge the power and principles of various religions".

Confessions spawned a successful spin-off book and, later, a Saturday night BBC television series which ran from 1995 to 1998 which was lukewarmly received in comparison to the radio feature and was criticised by the Broadcasting Standards Council.

Mayo revived Confessions on his Radio 1 mid-morning programme, which ran from 25 October 1993 to February 2001.

In January 2010, Mayo revived Confessions on his BBC Radio 2 drive-time show. After Mayo left Radio 2 at the end of 2018, it returned again on his mid-morning show on Scala Radio from 4 March 2019, and also on his solo drivetime show on Greatest Hits Radio from 15 March 2021.

References

BBC Radio 1 programmes
BBC Radio 2 programmes